PGI may refer to:
 Protected geographical indication, one of the three protected denominations for agricultural products of the European Union
 Parking guidance and information, signs and other indicators to assist in parking a car 
 Phosphoglucose isomerase, alternate name for Glucose-6-phosphate isomerase
 PGI (The Portland Group, Inc.), a former software company providing compilers and programming tools, now part of Nvidia
 PGI2 (Prostacyclin), a chemical which regulates blood clotting
 Pyrotechnics Guild International, association of professional and amateur fireworks enthusiasts
 PGI, IATA code for Chitato Airport in Angola
 PGI Management, an Andorra-based ski operation management company
 Piranha Games Inc., a Canadian video game developer
 Pontefract General Infirmary, the former name for Pontefract Hospital
 Postgraduate Institute of Medical Education and Research, a medical institute and research centre in Chandigarh, India
 Project for Good Information, American political group